Margarida Isabel Mano Tavares Simões Lopes (born 3 December 1963) is a Portuguese politician who served as Minister of Education and Science in 2015. Mano has a master's degree in economics from the University of Coimbra and a PhD in management from the University of Southampton. She is a member of the Social Democratic Party and was elected to the Assembly of the Republic by the Coimbra constituency in 2015.

References

1963 births
Living people
Portuguese politicians
Education ministers of Portugal
Women government ministers of Portugal
Social Democratic Party (Portugal) politicians